Eltroplectris calcarata, the longclaw orchid, is a terrestrial species of orchid. It is native to Florida, Bahamas, Cayman Islands, Cuba, Hispaniola, Jamaica, Puerto Rico, Windward Islands, Trinidad, Suriname, Venezuela, Colombia, Peru, Brazil, and Paraguay.

References

External links 

IOSPE orchid photos, Eltroplectris calcarata (Sw.) Garay & H.R. Sweet 1972 Photo by © Padre Pedro Ortiz Valdivieso
Swiss Orchid Foundation at Herbarium Jany Renz, Eltroplectris calcarata 
Calphotos, University of California, Eltroplectris calcarata; Spurred Neottia   

Spiranthinae
Orchids of North America
Orchids of South America
Flora of South America
Plants described in 1806
Flora of Florida
Flora of the Caribbean
Flora without expected TNC conservation status